Leccinum pseudoscabrum is an edible species of fungus in the genus Leccinum.

See also
List of Leccinum species

External links
 
 

pseudoscabrum